Mehrum Power Station is a coal-fired power station in Mehrum, Lower Saxony, Germany. It lies about 20km east of Hannover. It has an output of 750 megawatts. Today the unit 3, commissioned in 1979, is still in use. The power station has 120 employees. On 1 November 2017, it was sold by Enercity and BS Energy to Energetický a Průmyslový Holding (EPH).

References

Coal-fired power stations in Germany
Economy of Lower Saxony
Energetický a průmyslový holding